Robin Theryoung (born November 11, 1978, in Southfield, Michigan) is an American goalballer. She has been on medal-winning teams since the World Goalball Championships in 1998, where she shared a bronze medal. She has a master's degree in Blind Rehabilitation from Western Michigan University. Her vision is blurred due to albinism.

See also 
 United States women's national goalball team
 2012 Summer Paralympics roster

References 

1978 births
Living people
Female goalball players
Paralympic gold medalists for the United States
Paralympic silver medalists for the United States
Goalball players at the 2004 Summer Paralympics
Goalball players at the 2008 Summer Paralympics
Goalball players at the 2012 Summer Paralympics
Medalists at the 2004 Summer Paralympics
Medalists at the 2008 Summer Paralympics
Sportspeople from Southfield, Michigan
Western Michigan University alumni
Paralympic goalball players of the United States
Paralympic medalists in goalball
Medalists at the 2011 Parapan American Games